The Jostefonn glacier is located in Vestland county, Norway. Jostefonn was formerly a part of the large Jostedalsbreen glacier, but it is no longer connected to the main glacier.

See also
List of glaciers in Norway

References

Glaciers of Vestland
Sunnfjord
Sogndal